Carlos Armando Girón Gutiérrez (3 November 1954 — 13 January 2020) was a Mexican diver. He competed in four consecutive Summer Olympics, winning one medal.

At the 1972 Summer Olympics in Munich, Germany, he finished ninth in the 3 metre springboard event and eighth in the 10 metre platform event. In 1976 he repeated the position in the platform diving while advancing to a seventh place in the springboard.

At the 1980 Summer Olympics in Moscow, USSR he finally won a silver medal in 3 metre springboard, and came close to another medal with a fourth place in the 10 metre platform. His final Olympic performance came in 1984 where he placed twelfth.

On 13 January 2020, Girón died from pneumonia at age 65.

See also
 List of members of the International Swimming Hall of Fame
 A Step Away

References

External links
 Database Olympics (archived)
 

1954 births
2020 deaths
Deaths from pneumonia in Mexico
Mexican male divers
Divers at the 1972 Summer Olympics
Divers at the 1976 Summer Olympics
Divers at the 1980 Summer Olympics
Divers at the 1984 Summer Olympics
Olympic divers of Mexico
Olympic silver medalists for Mexico
Sportspeople from Mexicali
Olympic medalists in diving
Medalists at the 1980 Summer Olympics
Pan American Games gold medalists for Mexico
Pan American Games silver medalists for Mexico
Pan American Games bronze medalists for Mexico
Pan American Games medalists in diving
Divers at the 1975 Pan American Games
Divers at the 1979 Pan American Games
Medalists at the 1975 Pan American Games
Medalists at the 1979 Pan American Games
20th-century Mexican people
21st-century Mexican people